Paradracaena is an extinct genus of lizards from northern South America. Fossils of Paradracaena colombiana have been found in the Honda Group of Colombia, Peru and Brazil . The species was described as a member of the tegus; Tupinambis huilensis by Estes in 1961.

Description 

Paradracaena colombiana was first described as Tupinambis huilensis by Estes in 1961, later named Dracaena colombiana by Sullivan and Estes in 1997. These ground dwelling insectivore-carnivores were described from fossils found in fluvial and lacustrine clays of the Middle Miocene (Laventan in the SALMA classification) Villavieja Formation in Colombia. They share a number of features with extant caiman lizards, such as large teeth and a robust quadrate, but also bear more primitive characteristics, such as a higher tooth count.

Distribution 

Apart from the type locality in the Honda Group, fossils attributed to the genus Paradracaena were recovered from the Pebas and Solimões Formations of the Amazon Basin of respectively Peru and Brazil.

See also 
 List of fossiliferous stratigraphic units in Colombia

References

Bibliography

External links 
  Fauna de La Venta, Reptiles (lagartos) Paradracaena colombiana

Teiidae
Miocene reptiles of South America
Serravallian life
Laventan
Neogene Colombia
Fossils of Colombia
Honda Group, Colombia
Fossil taxa described in 1961